Fabio Cusaro (born 20 November 1984 in Novara) is an Italian professional football player currently playing for Tritium in Lega Pro Prima Divisione, Italian football's third tier, on loan from Serie B side, Cesena.

He joined Foligno on a six-month loan deal and will return to Cesena on 30 June 2011.

References

External links
 Player Profile from tuttocalciatori.it
 Player Profile from legaseriea.it

1984 births
Living people
Italian footballers
Novara F.C. players
Valenzana Mado players
A.C. Cesena players
A.C. Bellaria Igea Marina players
A.S.D. Città di Foligno 1928 players
A.C. Monza players
U.S. Alessandria Calcio 1912 players
Association football defenders
Universiade silver medalists for Italy
Universiade medalists in football
Medalists at the 2009 Summer Universiade